Harzandat may refer to:
Harzandat-e Gharbi Rural District
Harzandat-e Sharqi Rural District